Élisabeth Sophie de Lorraine (Marie Élisabeth Sophie; 1710 – 2 August 1740) was a French noblewoman and the second wife of Armand de Vignerot du Plessis, the notoriously lecherous Duke of Richelieu.

Biography

She was born in 1710 and was the second daughter of Joseph de Lorraine, Count of Harcourt and his wife Marie Louise Jeannin de Castille. Her older sister Louise Henriette Françoise married Emmanuel Théodose de La Tour d'Auvergne, Duke of Bouillon in 1725.

As a member of the House of Guise in France, she held the status of a princesse étrangère.

Family relations included Emmanuel Maurice de Lorraine-Guse, Duke of Elbeuf; Béatrice Hiéronyme de Lorraine, Abbess of Remiremont; Élisabeth Thérèse de Lorraine, Princess of Epinoy; and Queen Elisabeth of Sardinia.

She was proposed as a bride for Paul Anton, a prince of the Hungarian House of Esterházy, a distinguished soldier and patron of music. The marriage never materialised. 

In the end, with the help of Voltaire, the Duke of Richelieu was married to Élisabeth Sophie. As she was a princess of the House of Lorraine, Richelieu had to ask permission from the reigning Duke of Lorraine, Francis III Stephen. The Duke of Lorraine accepted and Élisabeth Sophie married Armand de Vignerot du Plessis, duc de Richelieu on 7 April 1734.

Richelieu had been married before to Anne Catherine de Noailles but had had no children. Élisabeth Sophie gave him two children, including the next Duke of Richelieu.

It was said at court that Élisabeth Sophie had a strong mind and a heart capable of great affection and gratitude. She was praised for her virtuous, passionate nature and was a devoted wife to one of the most notorious womanisers of the age.

She died of scurvy in her husband's arms on 2 August 1740, at about thirty years in age and only five months after the birth of her daughter. She was buried at the Chapelle de la Sorbonne on 20 August 1740. In 1780, her husband married again to Jeanne Catherine Josèphe de Lavaulx; there were no children from the marriage.

Issue

Antoine de Vignerot du Plessis (4 February 1736 – 1791) married Adélaide Gabrielle de Hautefort in 1765 and had issue; married Marie Antoinette de Gallifet and had issue;
Jeanne Sophie de Vignerot du Plessis (1 March 1740 – 14 October 1773) married Don Casimir Pignatelli, Count of Egmont, Duke of Bisaccia in 1755; no issue.

Ancestry

References and notes

1710 births
1740 deaths
Elisabeth Sophie
Elisabeth Sophie
Elisabeth Sophie
18th-century French people
French duchesses
Deaths from scurvy